Hasan Has (born 15 January 1960) is a Turkish weightlifter. He competed in the men's middleweight event at the 1984 Summer Olympics.

References

External links
 

1960 births
Living people
Turkish male weightlifters
Olympic weightlifters of Turkey
Weightlifters at the 1984 Summer Olympics
Place of birth missing (living people)
20th-century Turkish people